Marys River is a  tributary of the Willamette River in the U.S. state of Oregon. From its source at the confluence of its east and west forks near Summit, it flows generally southeast from the Central Oregon Coast Range to Corvallis.

Name
The origin of the name is uncertain, although it was used as early as 1846. Lewis A. and Lewis L. McArthur, in the seventh edition of Oregon Geographic Names find no support for the suggestion that employees of the Hudson's Bay Company had earlier named the stream St. Marys River. Rather, they summarize two stories about the origin. One is that Adam E. Wimple, an early settler, named the stream for his sister. Wimple was hanged at Dallas, Oregon, in 1852 for murdering his wife, also named Mary. The other story is that Wayman St. Clair, who represented Benton County in the territorial legislature in the early 1850s, named the river for Mary Lloyd. She was said to have been the first white woman to cross the river.

In 1847, Joseph C. Avery began laying out a town at the confluence of Marys River with the Willamette River, and the place was called Marysville. In 1853, the legislature changed the name of the town to Corvallis, a compounding of Latin words meaning heart of the valley. Prior to settlement by European Americans, fur traders referred to the Mary's River as Mouse River or Mice River. It is probable that nearby Marys Peak was named for the river.

Course
The main stem, formed by the confluence of the East Fork Marys River and the West Fork Marys River, begins at about river mile 40 (RM 40) or river kilometer 64 (RK 64) north of Marys Peak in the Central Oregon Coast Range.

Turning southeast, the river flows just south of Route 180, receiving Devitt Creek from the left before reaching the unincorporated community of Blodgett. Turning south and then east, it passes the unincorporated community of Harris at about RM 26.5 (RK 42.6) before reaching the unincorporated community of Wren.

Just east of Route 223, the river receives Read Creek from the left, then Blakesley Creek from the left at about RM 20 (RK 32) and soon turns sharply south. About  from the mouth, it flows under Route 20 for the third time, immediately receives Woods Creek from the right and turns southeast. It soon passes under Oregon Route 34 at the unincorporated community of Flynn, where it receives Greasy Creek from the right. Shortly thereafter, it flows under Oregon Route 99W and enters the Willamette River near the larger river's RM 132 (RK 212).

See also
List of rivers of Oregon

References

Works cited
McArthur, Lewis A., and McArthur, Lewis L. (2003) [1928]. Oregon Geographic Names, 7th ed. Portland: Oregon Historical Society Press. .

External links

Marys River Watershed Council
National Weather Service hydrograph
Bureau of Land Management: Marys River

Rivers of Oregon
Tributaries of the Willamette River
Rivers of Benton County, Oregon